Alberto Mantovani  (born 29 October 1948) is an Italian physician and immunologist. He is Scientific Director of Istituto Clinico Humanitas (Humanitas Clinical and Research Center), President and Founder of the Fondazione Humanitas per la Ricerca, and Professor of Pathology at the State University of Milan. He is known for his works in the roles of the immune system in the development of cancer. His research on tumor-associated macrophages (TAM, an acronym he coined) established inflammation as one of the causes of cancer. He was the first to identify monocyte chemotactic protein - 1 / CCL2 in 1983, and PTX3 in 1997. His works revealed the existence of decoy receptors in cell-signalling. He has been the most cited scientist in Italy, and one of the ten most cited immunologists worldwide.

Biography 
Mantovani was born in Milan on 29 October 1948. He studied medicine at the University of Milan and graduated (summa cum laude) in 1973. In 1976 he earned a specialization in oncology at the University of Pavia. Between 1973 and 1976, he worked as a visiting fellow at the Department of Tumor Immunology of the Chester Beatty Research Institute (now the Institute of Cancer Research) in Belmont, Sutton, England, where he continued the studies of Iwan Robert Evans and Peter Alexander. Between 1978 and 1979 he was a visiting fellow at the Laboratory of Immunodiagnosis at the National Institutes of Health in Bethesda, Maryland. In 1979 he was appointed Senior investigator in the Department of Tumor Immunology and Chemotherapy at the Istituto di Ricerche Farmacologiche "Mario Negri" in Milan. He became the Chief of Laboratory of the institute in 1981. In 1987 he worked at the Laboratory of Molecular Immunoregulation of NIH in Frederick, Maryland, as an Eleanor Roosvelt UICC Scholar. In 1994 he was promoted to Full Professor of General Pathology in the School of Medicine at the University of Brescia. He became Head of the Department of Immunology and Cell Biology at Istituto di Ricerche Farmacologiche "Mario Negri" in 1996. Between 2001 and 2014, he also served as Full Professor of General Pathology in the School of Medicine of the State University of Milan. Then he continued as Full Professor of General Pathology at Humanitas University in 2014. In 2005 he became the Scientific Director of Istituto Clinico Humanitas and President of Fondazione Humanitas per la Ricerca (under Humanitas University).

Research activities 
Following the deepening of the studies by Robert Evans and Peter Alexander on the role of macrophages in tumour formation, Mantovani discovered that macrophages, rather than helping to shrink the tumor, help it to grow and progress. He gave the acronym for such tumor-associated macrophages as TAM. His work in 2013 showed that targeting TAM is useful for cancer treatment. In 1983, his research team has discovered a protein, known as monocyte chemotactic protein - 1 / CCL2, which is part of the large superfamily of chemokines, which belong to the family of cytokines. His works help to establish the concept of "decoy receptors". From the study of the regulation of the cytokines, Mantovani was able to identify the operating principle of the decoy receptor for interleukin - 1. In 1993, his team showed interleukin-1 type II receptor acts as a decoy in the activity of interleukin 1. His team identified the first member of the long pentraxins, named PTX3 in 1997. The discovery was published in a series of papers. His team demonstrated in 2005 that the chemokine receptor D6 acts as a decoy and scavenger receptor for inflammatory chemokines. In 2015 his research, published in the journal Cell, showed that PTX3 gene is capable of curbing cancer by controlling inflammation.

Works

Scientific Publications

Awards 

 1998 - Biotech Award, Amgen - Dompe' - Vector Securities International,
 2000 - Marie T. Bonazinga Award, Boston, USA
 2004 - Guido Venosta Award, Italian Foundation for Cancer Research
 2006 - European Immunology Award, European Immunology Societies
 2007 - Galileo Galilei Prize for Research in Biomedical Sciences
 2007 - PISO Award
 2009 - William Harvey Medal, William Harvey Research Institute
 2011 - IMID Award for Excellence in Immunology
 2013 - Rusconi Lecture, Anna Villa e Felice Rusconi Foundation and University of Insubria
 2014 - Rosa Camuna Prize, Lombardy Region
 2014 - Barbara Baldacci Award, University of Bari
 2015 - Milstein Award, International Cytokine and Interferon Society (ICIS)
 2015 - Ferrari Soave Award, Academy of Sciences of Turin
 2015 - The Albert Struyvenberg Medal, European Society of Clinical Investigation
 2016 - OECI Oncology Prize, Organization of European Cancer Institutes
 2016 - Robert Koch Prize, Robert Koch Foundation
 2016 - Merck Serono Literary Prize
 2016 - Feltrinelli Prize, Lincean Academy
 2019 - Pezcoller Foundation-AACR International Award for Cancer Research

Honors 

Mantovani was appointed "Commander" of the Order of Merit of the Italian Republic in 2005. He was Fellow of the Italian Association Against Leukemias in 1973, and Fellow of the Anna Villa Rusconi Foundation in 1974. He was vice-president/president the International Union of Immunological Societies from 2013 to 2016. He served on the board of the Global Alliance for Vaccines and Immunization (GAVI) between 2007 and 2010. He was president of the International Cytokine Society during 2009–2010.

References

External links 
Profile at ScienceNet
Profile at F1000
Info at Humanitas University
Profile at Robert-Koch-Stiftung

Commanders of the Order of Merit of the Italian Republic
Italian immunologists
1948 births
Living people
University of Milan alumni
Academic staff of the University of Milan
University of Pavia alumni
Physicians from Milan